David Cox (born 17 March 1989) is a Scottish footballer who plays as a forward for Brechin City. 

Cox has previously played for Kilmarnock, Montrose, Annan Athletic, Alloa Athletic, Peterhead, Airdrieonians, Forfar Athletic, Cowdenbeath and Albion Rovers.

Career
Born in Lanark, Cox began his career with Kilmarnock where he made his first team debut, aged 19 on 10 May 2008, in their 2–0 victory over Hearts in the Scottish Premier League.

He left Kilmarnock in January 2009, On 18 June 2009, Cox signed a two-year contract with Annan Athletic. On 10 May 2012, he signed for newly promoted Alloa Athletic. In November 2012, Cox signed for Peterhead on loan, making his debut against Rangers on 10 November 2012. On 12 January 2013, the loan was turned into a permanent transfer.

After two and a half years with Peterhead, Cox moved to Scottish League One rivals Airdrieonians in June 2015, departing from the club in April 2016 to sign for Forfar Athletic. In January 2018, Cox was once again signed by manager Gary Bollan, this time for Scottish League Two strugglers Cowdenbeath. He played in both legs of the end-of-season play-off in which Cowdenbeath defeated Cove Rangers 3–2 to maintain their place in the SPFL.

In February 2018, Cox stated that he had been mocked by both players and fans for discussing his mental health problems. In December 2019, he commented that the abuse had continued and in some cases had worsened, and that it had caused him to be overly aggressive on the pitch and as a consequence he was considering quitting football, but that his club had offered their support.

In March 2021, Cox joined Scottish League Two side Albion Rovers. On 29 April 2021, during a match against Stenhousemuir, Cox left the stadium at half-time after an alleged taunt from opposition defender Jonathan Tiffoney,  and stated he was retiring from football due to the incident. Tiffoney later refuted the allegations and claimed it was Cox that verbally abused him. A few days later, Cox confirmed that he would not be reversing his decision to retire.

On 1 July 2021, Cox relented on his retirement, and signed for Highland Football League side Brechin City.

Career statistics

References

External links

1989 births
Living people
Sportspeople from Lanark
Scottish footballers
Kilmarnock F.C. players
Montrose F.C. players
Annan Athletic F.C. players
Alloa Athletic F.C. players
Peterhead F.C. players
Airdrieonians F.C. players
Forfar Athletic F.C. players
Cowdenbeath F.C. players
Scottish Football League players
Scottish Premier League players
Scottish Professional Football League players
Association football forwards
Albion Rovers F.C. players
Brechin City F.C. players
Highland Football League players
Footballers from South Lanarkshire